The Perovo Solar Park is a 100 MWp photovoltaic power station located at Perovo, Simferopol Raion, Crimea, Ukraine. As of July 2012, it was the world's fourth-largest solar farm, and was made up of 440,000 solar panels. It is owned by Activ Solar, and the final 20 MW stage was completed on December 29, 2011.

In 2009, Ukraine established a feed-in tariff of €0.46 per kilowatt-hour until 2030, one of the highest.

As of January 2012, the Perovo Solar Park was the most powerful solar power plant in the world, with 100 MW capacity. At that time, it was followed by the Canadian Sunny Power Plant "Sarnia" at 97 MW, the Italian Montalto Di O at 84.2 MW, and the German Finsterwalde at 80.7 MW.

The park consists of 440,000 crystalline solar photovoltaic modules, connected by 1,500 km of cable and installed on more than 200 hectares of area (covers approximately 259 football fields).

Electricity produced by this plant was sufficient to meet the needs of the city of Simferopol in 2012. The total capacity of all solar power plants in the territory of the Crimea: "Perova", "Ohcastrotnikov", "Mitaine" and "Rodnikov", was 227.26 MW, which was more than 15 percent of the total energy needs of all Crimea, which was 1200 MW at that time.

The new power station surpassed the five previous world largest photovoltaic parks. Another active Solar Project in Crimea - 82,65-Megawant "Okhotnikovo", installed in 2012. 

Perovo Solar Park was built  in seven months. The power plants used solar panels of Asian manufacturers and inverters of European companies.

Occupation and subsequent annexation by Russia 

Before the occupation of Crimea by Russia, the substation was integrated into the grid power distribution system of Ukraine.  After the occupation by Russia, the plant started supplying energy to the Crimean Peninsula for the needs of civilians.

This plant, like a number of other solar farm projects, received loans from a group of banks that hoped to make a profit from investments through a special "green tariff" that was established by the Ukrainian Government. However, due to cheap electricity from Russia and lack of current subsidy, the stations are unprofitable. Now, only part of their power is used. The plant tried to get a green tariff in the Russian Federation.

See also

List of photovoltaic power stations

References

Photovoltaic power stations in Ukraine